The following are the national records in athletics in the Czech Republic maintained by the Czech Athletics Federation (ČAS). Of the records from the era of Czechoslovakia, those who represented a Czech club at the time of the record are included.

Outdoor

Key to tables:

+ = en route to a longer distance

h = hand timing

Mx = mark was made in a mixed race

OT = oversized track (> 200m in circumference)

Men

Women

Mixed

Indoor

Men

Women

Notes

References
General
Czech Records  24 July 2022 updated
Specific

External links
ČAS web site
Czech Indoor All Comers Records  31 March 2015 updated

Czech
Records
Athletics
Athletics